Drapetes may refer to:
 Drapetes (beetle), a beetle genus in the family Elateridae
 Drapetes (plant), a plant genus in the family Thymelaeaceae